The following is a list of international players in the Australian Women's National Basketball League (WNBL).

The list includes players both past and present. This list includes players from Australia who represent other nations internationally, as well as international players who have Australian permanent residency.

By country
Note: This list is correct as of 21 March 2022.

See also

 List of WNBL awards
 List of Australian WNBA players
 List of foreign WNBA players

References

 sts
Lists of women's basketball players
Foreign
 
Employment of foreign-born
Women's sport-related lists